"Tchouk tchouk musik" is a song recorded by French singer Priscilla Betti.  It was released on 15 April, 2003 in France, Switzerland and Belgium (Wallonia) as the second single from her second album Priscilla. It reached number 7 on the French singles chart and received a Silver disc certification.

Song information
Philippe Osman (music) and Bertrand Châtenet (lyrics) participated in the composition and the production of the single.  Osman also made all the arrangements and performed the background vocals with Priscilla, while Châtenet mixed the song.

The music video shows Priscilla dancing and performing a choreography on a beach, surrendered by many people.

In France, the single started at number 24 on 19 April 2003, then reached the top ten the next week and peaked at number seven in the fourth week. The single totaled three weeks in the top ten, 22 weeks in the top 50 and 33 weeks in the top 100. It was eventually certified Silver disc by the SNEP and ranked 49th on the Annual Chart.

Track listing
 CD single

 Digital download

Personnel
 Lyrics by Bertrand Châtenet
 Music by Philippe Osman
 Arrangement, programmation and all instruments by Philippe Osman
 Mixing by Bertrand Châtenet and Jérôme Devoise
 Mastered by André Perriat at Top Master studio
 Vocals by Priscilla and Philippe Osman
 Produced by B.Châtenet, P.Osman and P.Debort

Charts and sales

Peak positions

Year-end charts

Certifications

References

External links
 "Tchouk tchouk musik", lyrics + music video

2002 songs
2003 singles
Priscilla Betti songs
Jive Records singles
Songs written by Philippe Osman
Songs written by Bertrand Châtenet